The 1901 Washington Agricultural football team was an American football team that represented Washington Agricultural College as an independent during the 1901 college football season. In its first season under head coach William Namack, the team compiled a 4–1 record and outscored opponents by a total of 47 to 7. The team played its home games at Soldier Field in Pullman, Washington, and was recognized as the co-champion of the northwest.

Schedule

References

Washington Agricultural
Washington State Cougars football seasons
Washington Agricultural football